Stanislas Blanchard (2 December 1871 – 7 December 1949) was a Canadian politician and gentleman. He was elected to the House of Commons of Canada in the 1926 election to represent the Liberal Party in the riding of Restigouche—Madawaska. He did not run in the 1930 election.

External links

1871 births
1949 deaths
Liberal Party of Canada MPs
Members of the House of Commons of Canada from New Brunswick